Khazal bin Jabir bin Merdaw al-Kabi  (، ) (18 August 1863 – 24 May 1936), Muaz us-Sultana, and Sardar-e-Aqdas (Most Sacred Officer of the Imperial Order of the Aqdas), was the Ruler of Arabistan, the Sheikh of Mohammerah from the Kasebite clan of the Banu Ka'b, of which he was the Sheikh of Sheikhs, the Overlord of the Mehaisan tribal confederation and the Ruler of the Shatt al-Arab.

Historical background
On 2 June 1897, Khaz'al inherited the Emirate of Mohammerah. The emirate, although within the Persian Empire, was autonomous and allowed to conduct its own affairs.

Although never a part of the British Empire, the Persian Gulf had been effectively incorporated into the British imperial system since the early 19th century. The conclusion of treaties and agreements with the region's various tribal rulers was one of the central means by which Britain enforced its hegemonic presence, and Khaz’al was no exception to this trend.

Rise to power 
After Jabir's death in 1881, his elder son, Maz'al, took over as tribal leader and Sheikh of Mohammerah, as well as the provincial governor-general, which was confirmed by an Imperial firman (executive order). However, in June 1897 Maz'al was killed. Some accounts state that he was assassinated by his younger brother, Khaz'al, while others state that this was done by a palace guard under orders from Khaz'al.

Thereafter Khaz'al assumed his position as Sheikh of Mohammerah, proclaiming himself not only the leader of the Bani Kaab, but also the ruler of the entire province. He then appointed his sons to the governorships of the various cities, towns and villages within his control, including Naseriyeh.

The Anglo-Persian Oil Company
The oil industry owed its early success to Sheikh Khaz'al. Once oil was discovered in Masjed Soleyman in 1908, by the Anglo-Persian Oil Company (APOC), later BP, Khaz'al's ties to Britain strengthened. In 1909, the British government asked Percy Cox, British resident to Bushehr, to negotiate an agreement with Khaz'al for APOC to obtain a site on Abadan Island for a refinery, depot, storage tanks, and other operations. The refinery was built and began operating in 1912. Khaz'al was knighted in 1910 and supported Britain in World War I.

Following the discovery of oil in Arabistan-controlled territory, the British moved quickly to establish control over the vast oil resources in the province, which culminated in the foundation of the Anglo-Persian Oil Company in 1909. The British established a treaty with Khaz'al, whereby in exchange for their guaranteed support and protection against any external attack, he would also guarantee to maintain internal security and not interfere with the process of oil extraction. As part of the treaty they were given a monopoly of drilling in the province in return for an annual payment to Khaz'al, though the profits of the company vastly exceeded the annual payments.

Sheikh Khaz'al turns down the throne of Kuwait 
In 1920, the Sheikh of Kuwait, Salim Al Mubarak Al Sabah, ambushed Ibn Saud's men over a border dispute between Kuwait and Najd. When Percy Cox was informed of this event, he sent a letter to Khaz'al offering the Kuwaiti throne to either him or one of his heirs, knowing that Khaz'al would be a wiser ruler. Khaz'al, who considered the Al Sabah as his own family, replied "Do you expect me to allow the stepping down of Al Mubarak from the throne of Kuwait? Do you think I can accept this?" He then asked:

Conflict with Reza Khan and downfall 

In November 1923, when Khaz’al Khan had seen Ahmad Shah Qajar off, as he was crossing the border for Europe, the Emperor had told him about his fears of Reza Khan's ambitions in the same way as he had spoken openly to Percy Loraine. Then came the Shah's telegram of April 1924 about his loss of confidence in Reza Khan. In the following summer, Khaz’al brought together some regional magnates and tribal heads – the Vali of Poshtkuh, heads of the Khamseh federation of tribes, and many of the local Arab tribal leaders – in a coalition to resist Reza. They described themselves as the Committee of the Rising for Happiness, and sent telegrams and statements to Tehran. Their statements demanded constitutional government and the return of the Shah, who they said had been forced to remain in Europe. They also attacked military violations of the people's rights in the provinces, and ‘the massacres of Loristan’; demanded Reza Khan's dismissal; and described the Prince Regent, Ali Reza Khan Azod al-Molk, as the legitimate fount of authority. It was all in the name of the law, justice and the constitution, and ‘in the illustrious name of His Imperial Majesty Soltan Ahmad Shah, the constitutional monarch’. The committee sought to defend and protect constitutionalism, and stop the traitors and criminals freely dispensing with it and re-establishing the apparatus of arbitrary rule and injustice once again ... and stop Reza Khan from trampling the principles of democratic government under foot by arbitrary government."
The Prince Regent wrote an encouraging letter to Khaz’al, all in the name of the Shah and for protection of the constitution, and said that the bearer would discuss matters with the Shaikh in detail. The Shah and the court did not have the courage to commit themselves firmly to such a movement, but would go along with it if there was a very good change of success. Reza Khan subsequently sent him a bombastic tactless telegram, after which the Sheikh expressed his determination to overthrow Reza Khan or perish in the attempt. He declared that he would abandon his defensive measures only if Reza agreed to the following: (i) to give written guarantees regarding the safety of life and property of those who were helping the Sheikh – especially the Bakhtiari Amir Mujahid. (ii) to withdraw all troops from Arabistan including Bebehan; (iii) to cancel the revenue settlement of the previous year and return to the pre-war basis; and (iv) to give a more specific confirmation of his firmans. On September 13th the British Political Resident was told to convey a message to Reza Khan to accept Khaz'al's conditions.In the meantime, the Political Resident had interviewed the Sheikh, his second son (Sheikh Abdul Hamid), the Bakhtiari Amir Mujahid and Colonel Riza Quli Khan (who had replaced Colonel Baqir Khan at Shushtar but who had apparently thrown in his lot with the Sheikh); all declared that no peace with Reza Khan was possible; the Sheikh had telegraphed to the Majlis explaining that his opposition was to Reza Khan personally and that it was hoped to persuade the Shah to return. On September 16 the Sheikh had also addressed a telegram to the foreign legations in Tehran in the nature of a proclamation against Reza Khan, who was described as a usurper and a transgressor of the Persian Empire. Reza sent a telegram to Khaz’al that stating that he should either apologise to him and relent publicly, or take the full consequences.

Khaz’al and his remaining associates could muster an army of 25,000 men, which was no less than Reza Khan could throw in the region at the time. In fact the army he had amassed at the foot of the Loristan elevations was 15,000 strong. But Khaz’al did not dare to go into action without British approval. The British government was in no mood to go to war on Khaz’al's behalf. Loraine convinced Khaz’al to desist and to apologize to Reza Khan. In return, he promised to intervene with Reza Khan to halt the advance of his troops into Arabistan. The Shaikh sent an apology, but, realizing that the danger had passed, Reza Khan paid little attention to Loraine's representations on the Shaikh's behalf. He let the troops pour into Arabistan, and demanded that Khaz’al should surrender unconditionally and go straight to Tehran. The Foreign Office was very unhappy at Reza Khan's intransigence. In the presence of Loraine, Khaz’al and Reza met and even swore an oath of friendship on the Qur’an. After a short while, Reza broke all his pledges. In April 1925, he ordered one of his commanders, who had a friendly relationship with Khaz'al, to meet Khaz'al. The commander, General Fazlollah Zahedi, accompanied by several government officials, met with Khaz'al and spent an evening with him on board his yacht, anchored in the Shatt al-Arab river by his palace in Failiyeh near the city of Mohammerah. Later that evening several gunboats, sent by Reza Khan, stealthily made their way next to the yacht, which was then immediately boarded by fifty Persian troops. The soldiers kidnapped Khaz'al and took him by motorboat down the river to Mohammerah, where a car was waiting to take him to the military base in Ahwaz. From there he was taken to Dezful, along with his son and heir, and then to the city of Khorramabad in Lorestan, and then eventually to Tehran.

Upon his arrival, Khaz'al was warmly greeted and well received by Reza Khan, who assured him that his problems would be quickly settled, and that in the meantime, he would be treated very well. However, many of his personal assets in Arabistan were quickly liquidated and his properties eventually came under the domain of the Imperial government after Reza Khan was crowned the new Shah. The emirate was abolished and the provincial authority took full control of regional affairs.

Khaz'al spent the rest of his life under virtual house arrest, unable to travel beyond Tehran's city limits. He was able to retain ownership of his properties in Kuwait and Iraq, where he was exempted from taxation. In May 1936, while alone in his house, as earlier in the day his servants had been taken to court by the police, he was murdered by one of the guards stationed outside his house under direct orders from Reza Shah.

Freemasonry 
Sheikh Khaz'al was an active Freemason and a recipient of many high Masonic honours. Up until his death, Sheikh Khaz'al was the most influential of all Masons of the Middle East. It is not clear when exactly Sheikh Khaz'al joined Freemasonry. What is known, is that he was the first Freemason among the inhabitants of the Persian Gulf, and that he became the Grand Master of Freemasonry in all Mesopotamia. It is likely that the East India Co. established the first Masonic lodge in the area and that Sheikh Khaz'al became its first chairman.

A secret document found after the seizure of Masonic lodges in Egypt was the agenda for al-Abbasi Lodge No. 223 of Cairo for its meeting of 16 December 1923. One of the items discussed the subject of presenting Sheikh Khaz'al, the chairman of 'Khaz'al' lodge, and the regional Grand Master of Mesopotamia, with a decoration in recognition of his valuable services to Freemasonry.

Humanitarian acts

Chaldean victims of the Ottoman Empire 

In October 1914, the Assyrian genocide occurred whereby thousands of Chaldeans were killed or deported by the Ottoman Empire. After having experienced such atrocities on the hands of the Ottomans, the Chaldean Catholics began to migrate away from their homeland, in search of somewhere safer. Some of these emigrants found their way to the city of Ahwaz where,"...under the protective shadow of His Highness the Sardar Aqdas… they found refugee, and when their numbers increased, they approached His Highness asking for a plot of land that they may build a church and a school to bring up their children and he accepted with what he promised of the welcoming of the heart and the tolerance of the palm and he granted them the land and he provided them endowment. The Chaldeans had found in Ahwaz justice and safety and were envied by their brothers who had not emigrated."

When the Patriarch of Babylon for the Chaldean Catholics, Emmanuel Joseph saw what had been done, in the year 1920, he decided to repeat what he had seen to Pope Benedict XV. He explained that those of his spiritual children who had remained happy in the East were the ones who emigrated to Ahwaz and lived under the shadow of the Sardar Aqdas. The Pope was moved by the benevolence of Sheikh Khaz’al Khan towards those who were distressed amongst the children of the church and he granted him the Order of St Gregory the Great of the rank of Knight Commander, announcing his thanks and his acknowledgment of "...the grace of this great and generous Arab King".

King Faisal I attempts to kidnap Sheikh Khaz’al from Tehran 
The first of a number of attempts to rescue Khaz’al was in 1927 by King Faisal I of Iraq. Faisal felt that the arrest of Khaz’al and the treatment of the Persian government towards Arabistan were severe and cruel. Moreover, Faisal felt that he was in debt to Khaz’al for withdrawing his candidacy for the throne of Iraq. For Faisal, after being deposed from the Kingship of Syria, was a King without a country. He viewed this mission not only as an act of loyalty, but more importantly, of duty. Faisal informed Nuri al-Said of his plan to which the latter recommended using diplomacy rather than physical intervention.

Meanwhile, al-Said, without Faisal's knowledge, informed Henry Dobbs, the British Ambassador to Iraq, of the latters intentions of kidnapping Khaz’al. Dobbs immediately met with Faisal and warned him of the consequences of such an act, stating that ‘His Majesty's Government’ would take a firm stand against him. "Do not play with fire, King Faisal," warned Dobbs.

Honours 

 Sardar Aqdas (1st Class) of the Most Sacred Order of the Aqdas (May 1920)
 Exalted Rank and Title Sardar Arfa (1902)
 Mu’izz us-Sultana (April 1898)
 Order of the Lion and the Sun (Military)
 Imperial Order of Osmanieh (Nishan-i-Osmanieh)
 Knight 1st Class of the Order of Saint Stanislaus (1904)
  Honorary Knight Grand Commander of the Order of the Indian Empire (GCIE) (3.6.1916)
  Honorary Knight Commander of the Order of the Indian Empire (KCIE) (15.10.1910)
  Honorary Knight Commander of the Order of the Star of India (KCSI) (22.6.1914)
  Personal salute of 12-guns (22 September 1909), prom to 13-guns with a permanent salute of 7-guns (1922)
 Knight Commander of the Order of St. Gregory the Great (1921)

Places named after Sheikh Khaz'al 

 Khazaliyeh, a village in present-day Iran, once part of the Emirate of Mohammerah
 Al-Khazaliya Street Doha, Qatar
 Qasr Khaz'al (the Khaz'al Palace), Kuwait
 Diwan Khaz'al, Dasman, Kuwait

Publications 

 Al-Riyāḍ al-Khazʻalīyah fī al-siyāsah al-insānīyah

See also
 al-Sabah
 Ethnic politics of Khuzestan
 History of Khuzestan

References

Sources

Further reading
 Tarikh-e Pahnsad Saal-e Khuzestan (Five Hundred Year History of Khuzestan) by Ahmad Kasravi
 Jang-e Iran va Britannia dar Mohammerah (The Iran-British War in Mohammerah) by Ahmad Kasravi
 Tarikh-e Bist Saal-e Iran (Twenty Year History of Iran) by Hossein Maki (Tehran, 1945–47)
 Hayat-e Yahya (The Life of Yahya) by Yahya Dolatabadi (Tehran, 1948–52)
 Tarikh-e Ejtemai va Edari Doreieh Qajarieh (The Administrative and Social History of the Qajar Era) by Abdollah Mostofi (Tehran, 1945–49)  (for the English translation)
 Amin al-Rayhani, Muluk al-Arab, aw Rihlah fi al-bilad al-Arabiah (in two volumes, 1924–25), Vol 2, part 6 on Kuwait.
 Ansari, Mostafa – The History of Khuzistan, 1878–1925, unpublished PhD. dissertation, University of Chicago, 1974

External links
 Article about Khaz'al with photos (in Persian)
History of the Al-Sabah Dynasty of Kuwait

Ancestry

1863 births
1936 deaths
Iranian Arab politicians
Arab nationalists
19th-century Arabs
20th-century Arabs
Ahwazi Arabs
Honorary Knights Grand Commander of the Order of the Indian Empire
Honorary Knights Commander of the Order of the Star of India
People of the Persian Constitutional Revolution
People from Basra
Recipients of the Order of Saint Stanislaus (Russian)
History of Kuwait
Freemasonry